Fire prevention is a function of many fire departments. The goal of fire prevention is to educate the public on the precautions which should be taken to prevent potentially harmful fires and how to survive these fires if they do occur. It is a proactive method of preventing fire-based emergencies and reducing the damage caused by them. Many fire departments have one or more Fire Prevention Officers, which may also be a routine duty of firefighters.

In the general sense of preventing harmful fires, many aspects are discussed in the articles Fire protection and Fire safety. In the United States, national work on best practices is in the Vision 2020 program.

Target audiences

Students
Children are the primary target of fire prevention knowledge. Firefighters will often visit schools and teach students the basics of fire prevention and fire safety, including how to evacuate from a burning building and how to prevent fires by avoiding dangerous activities such as playing with matches.

Elderly and disabled people
Elderly and disabled people are potentially at greater risk in emergency situations as a result of poor mobility or not understanding the danger they are in. Fire prevention outreach often involves ensuring that these groups have a clearly defined plan of what to do in the event of an emergency and easy access to emergency exits.

Landlords
In many jurisdictions, landlords are responsible for implementing fire prevention and fire safety measures in accordance with various laws.

Lessons
Fire prevention education can take the form of videos, pamphlets, and banners. Often, the messages and lessons are simple tips. Common lessons taught during fire prevention seminars include:

Stop, drop and roll

Stop, drop and roll is often taught as part of fire protection education efforts as it is both a simple technique and an effective way of extinguishing burning clothing. It is particularly suited to children who may panic if their clothing catches fire and they do not know how to put it out.

Smoke detector installation and maintenance
Generally taught more to adults (particularly homeowners), a core part of fire prevention outreach involves encouraging people to ensure that they have an adequate number of smoke detectors installed in homes, and that they are kept in good working order and tested regularly. These steps can significantly reduce deaths in household fires, particularly at night when people are sleeping. Smoke detectors generally make a persistent beeping sound when their batteries run low, and a key part of fire prevention outreach involves encouraging people to replace batteries promptly instead of just removing them to make the beeping stop.

Wet pipe sprinkler systems
A wet-pipe sprinkler system is an automatic sprinkler system in which the supply valves are open and the system is charged with water under supply pressure at all times. For this reason, they are the quickest at getting water on the fire and are the simplest to maintain. Wet pipe systems are installed where indoor temperatures can be maintained at or above . Below that temperature, there is the danger of freezing pipes. If the outside temperature is below freezing and the interior temperature is less than 40 degrees Fahrenheit, the steel sprinkler piping, which rapidly conducts heat and rapidly loses it, will drop below freezing. The frozen area may be isolated and near an opening or uninsulated portion of the building. It may be a small area, but it could be enough to put the whole system out of service.

Abandoned cooking and appliances
Teaching people not to leave stoves, ovens, toasters, clothing irons, barbecues, and candles unattended can help to reduce as a result.

Firefighters are here to help
One of the most critical jobs of a firefighter is search and rescue. For young children, it is important that firefighters are seen as people they can follow and trust. A firefighter in bunker gear breathing with an air tank could be an unfamiliar sight, especially to a child. One way a child can get used to or trust a firefighter is seeing a firefighter dress, step by step, seeing that they are a person wearing a uniform and protective equipment. Furthermore, being able to walk up and touch the firefighter can reassure the child that he or she is a real person. (This has been implemented by many fire departments across the US during Fire Prevention Week.)

Discouraging playing with fire
Though fire can be a source of fascination for young children, the potential for accidents, as a result, is high. Fire prevention often aims to teach children not to play with fire so that they do not accidentally cause a conflagration.

Reduction of false alarms
Much of fire prevention education also involves advice on how to reduce false alarms. False alarms have the potential to waste manpower and resources, which may be needed desperately during a real emergency. In addition, firefighters responding to calls in fire engines are at increased risk of traffic collisions when driving under emergency conditions. In 2008 the state of New York found that 18% of firefighter deaths in the line of duty had occurred whilst responding to calls.

Fire prevention inspections
Many fire departments have fire prevention divisions, which consist of groups of firefighters who conduct building inspections to make sure they are compliant with fire codes; they also visit schools and daycare centers to make presentations about arson, malicious false alarms, and fire safety. Fire Prevention Officers may also conduct tours of their fire house for visitors. They demonstrate what each of their apparatuses does, and sometimes will don their bunker gear to show what a firefighter wears into a fire.

A typical fire prevention division consists of a Chief Fire Prevention Officer, below whom are Fire Prevention Officers. Those in the Fire Prevention Division have their own insignia, such as epaulets with two thin bars that read "FIRE PREVENTION OFFICER" below them; crescents on their helmets; and collar pins. Depending on its budget, a Division may have its own fire vehicle.

In Canada the national Fire Protection division is known as FIPRECAN, and is the national voice for fire protection and education in Canada. FIPRECAN is a non-profit charitable agency founded in 1976.  They educate the public themselves as well as form a partnership with fire services.  David Johnston, the former Governor General of Canada, is one of the patrons.

Fire Prevention Canada primarily promotes and educates by:
 Working with all levels of the government
 Working with fire services to promote fire prevention week activities
 Working with other fire prevention and safety organizations
 Partnering with the Federal Government of Canada

On their website Fiprecan.ca, many safety educational materials can be found.  These forms are downloadable and printable.  All of the information is free of charge.  A few of the available topics are listed below.
 Cooking precautions
 Babysitters guide
 Escape Plan
 Fire extinguishers
 Smoke alarm
 Farm safety

October 3–9 is fire protection week in Canada. Various fire organizations and fire professionals from all across the country attend, along with a number of students and teachers.  Songs and entertainment regarding fire safety are also available making fire education fun.  Guest speakers are also a large part of fire protection week.  Children also generally receive prizes.

In Alberta, Canada, Alberta Industrial Fire Association is a dominant fire safety educator.  They host events year-round ranging from conferences to skill competitions.  A number of presentations can be found on their website aifpa.org regarding a wide variety of topics such as

a) Awareness and Planning

b) Safety Products

c) General Tips

Alberta Industrial Fire Association was founded in 1989 by Len Freeman and Brian Lamond.  Alberta Industrial Fire Association's mission statement is: To promote awareness of industrial fire protection and emergency services by information sharing, and joint problem solving to minimize damage, loss, and injury throughout the industry in the Province of Alberta.

Fire Prevention Week
Fire Prevention Week is observed in the United States in October.

Many fire departments observe "Fire Prevention Month" for all of October. Fire departments may visit schools, hang banners, give firehouse tours or hold open houses.

See also

Controlled burn
Firefighting
Hypoxic air technology for fire prevention
National Fire Protection Association

References

Fire prevention